Ted Stryker may refer to:

 Stryker (disc jockey)
 A character from Alone in the Dark 2
 Ted Stryker, a character from Zero Hour!
 Ted Striker, a character from Airplane!